Tsrancha is a village in southwestern Bulgaria. It is located in the municipality of Dospat, Smolyan Province.

Geography 

The village of Tsrancha is located in the Western Rhodope Mountains. It is situated in the Chech region.

Religion 

The population is Muslim. Most inhabitants of the village are Pomaks.

Notes 

Villages in Smolyan Province
Chech